Henrik Signell (born 2 January 1976 in Gothenburg) is a handball coach  of the Swedish club IFK Skövde and former head coach for the Swedish women's national team,.

Career as a player
As a player, he represented the Swedish national team once, but played 48 U18/U21 national team matches and 38 national junior matches.

Achievements as a coach
 3 Swedish Championship Gold Medals (women)
 2 Swedish Championship Gold Medals (men, as assistant coach)
 3 Swedish Junior Championship Gold Medals (men)

References

1976 births
Living people
Swedish handball coaches
Handball coaches of international teams
Sportspeople from Gothenburg